Coronella girondica, commonly known as the southern smooth snake or Riccioli's snake, is a species of harmless snake in the family Colubridae. The species is endemic to southern Europe and northern Africa. No subspecies are recognized as being valid.

Geographic range
C. girondica is found in Spain, Portugal, southern France, Monaco, Italy, Morocco, Algeria, and Tunisia. The type locality given is Bordeaux, France.

Description
C. girondica is brown, grayish, or reddish dorsally, with dark brown or blackish transverse bars or spots. On the nape there is a dark U-shaped mark, or a pair of dark elongate spots. There is a dark streak from the eye to the corner of the mouth, a dark band from eye to eye across the prefrontals, and a black line below the eye. Ventrally it is yellowish or red with black markings. The dorsal scales, which are smooth, are in 21 rows (rarely 19). Adults may attain a total length of 62 cm (2 feet), of which 12.5 cm (5 inches) is tail.

Habitat

The natural habitats of C. girondica are temperate forests, Mediterranean-type shrubby vegetation, rocky areas, pastureland, and plantations.

It is threatened by habitat loss.

Conservation status
This species, C. girondica,  is classified as Least Concern (LC) on the IUCN Red List of Threatened Species (v3.1, 2001). Species are listed as such due to their wide distribution, presumed large population, or because it is unlikely to be declining fast enough to qualify for listing in a more threatened category. Year assessed: 2005.

See also
List of reptiles of Italy

References

Further reading
Arnold EN, Burton JA (1978). A Field Guide to Reptiles and Amphibians of Britain and Europe. (With 351 illustrations, 257 in colour by D.W. Ovenden). London: Collins. 272 pp. + Plates 1-40. . (Coronella girondica, pp. 205-206 + Plate 38, figure 2 + Map 118).
Daudin FM (1803). Histoire Naturelle, Générale et Particulière des Reptiles; Ouvrage faisant suite aux Œuvres de Leclerc de Buffon, et partie du Cours complet d'Histoire naturelle rédigé par C. S. Sonnini, membre de plusieurs Sociétés savantes. Tome sixième [Volume 6]. Paris: F. Dufart. 447 pp. (Coluber girondica, new species, pp. 432-434). (in French and Latin).
Jan [G], Sordelli F (1866). Iconographie générale des Ophidiens, Dix-septième livraison. Paris: J.-B. Baillière et Fils. Index + Plates I-VI. (Coronella girondica, Plate III, figures 1-3). (in French). 

Colubrids
Reptiles of North Africa
Reptiles described in 1803
Taxonomy articles created by Polbot
Reptiles of Europe